Tihaljina is a town in southwestern Bosnia and Herzegovina. It is in the West Herzegovina Canton of the Federation of Bosnia and Herzegovina. It is part of the Grude municipality. It has many cemeteries.

Demographics 
According to the 1991 Yugoslav census, there were 1,734 residents in the town of Tihaljina, of 1,732 were ethnic Croats.

According to the 2013 census, its population was 1,466.

References

External links

Tihaljina Official Site

Populated places in Grude